A driveway (also called drive in UK English) is a type of private road for local access to one or a small group of structures, and is owned and maintained by an individual or group.

Driveways rarely have traffic lights, but some that bear heavy traffic, especially those leading to commercial businesses and parks, do.

Driveways may be decorative in ways that public roads cannot, because of their lighter traffic and the willingness of owners to invest in their construction. Driveways are not resurfaced, snow blown or otherwise maintained by governments. They are generally designed to conform to the architecture of connected houses or other buildings.

Some of the materials that can be used for driveways include concrete, decorative brick, cobblestone, block paving, asphalt, gravel, resin-bound paving, decomposed granite, and surrounded with grass or other ground-cover plants.

Driveways are commonly used as paths to private garages, carports, or houses. On large estates, a driveway may be the road that leads to the house from the public road, possibly with a gate in between. Some driveways divide to serve different homeowners. A driveway may also refer to a small apron of pavement in front of a garage with a curb cut in the sidewalk, sometimes too short to accommodate a car.

Often, either by choice or to conform with local regulations, cars are parked in driveways in order to leave streets clear for traffic. Moreover, some jurisdictions prohibit parking or leaving standing any motor vehicle upon any residential lawn area (defined as the property from the front of a residential house, condominium, or cooperative to the street line other than a driveway, walkway, concrete or blacktopped surface parking space). Other examples include the city of Berkeley, California that forbids "any person to park or leave standing, or cause to be parked or left standing any vehicle upon any public street in the City for seventy-two or more consecutive hours." Other areas may prohibit leaving vehicles on residential streets during certain times (for instance, to accommodate regular street cleaning), necessitating the use of driveways.

Residential driveways are also used for such things as garage sales, automobile washing and repair, and recreation, notably (in North America) for basketball practice.

See also 
 Access management
 Pavement (material)
 Parkway

References 

Types of roads
Architectural elements
Garden features